Microthermal analysis is a materials characterization technique which combines the thermal analysis principles of differential scanning calorimetry (DSC) with high spatial resolution of scanning probe microscopy. The instrument consists of a thermal probe  which is basically a fine platinum/rhodium alloy wire (5 micro meter in diameter) coated by a sheath of silver (Wollaston wire). The wire is bent  into V-shape and the silver sheath is etched away to form a fine pointed tip. The probe acts as both the heater as well as temperature sensor. The probe is attached to a conventional scanning probe microscope and can be scanned over the sample surface to spatially resolve the thermal behavior of the sample.

This technique has been widely used for localized thermal analysis, where the probe is heated rapidly to avoid thermal diffusion through the sample and the response of the substance in immediate proximity to the tip is measured as a function of temperature. Micro-thermal analysis was launched
commercially in March 1998. 

Microthermal analysis has been extended to higher spatial resolution to nanothermal analysis which uses microfabricated self-heating silicon cantilevers to probe thermomechanical properties of materials with sub-100 nm spatial resolution.

References

External links

Application notes from TA Instruments

Materials science